Wartislaw II Swantibor, also known as Wartislaw the Younger or Wartislaw Swantiboritz (d. 1196) was a member of a cadet line of the House of Griffins, who ruled the Duchy of Pomerania.  Wartislaw II was Castellan of Szczecin.  He is the only known son of Swantibor I, a Pomeranian prince about whom very little is known.

In the early 1170s, a Danish army under King Valdemar I besieged Szczecin Castle.  Reportedly, Wartislaw II surrendered and handed the castle to the Danes.  In 1173, he founded Kołbacz Abbey.

After the death of Duke Bogislaw I in 1187, Wartislaw II and Boglislaw's widow Anastasia jointly acted as guardians and regents for the underage Dukes Bogislaw II and Casimir II.  The fact that he was their guardian is considered a strong indication that he was closely related to them; the exact family relationship is unknown.  Wartislaw II was charged with convincing King Canute VI of Denmark to enfeoffed the young Dukes with Pomerania.  However, a revolt against Denmark broke out during his rule, and in 1189, Canute VI deposed him and appointed Prince Jaromar I of Rügen as regent.  Wartislaw II then retired from public life.

Nothing is known about his later life, except the archives of Kołbacz mention that he died in 1196.

Issue 
His known sons:
 Bartholomew of Szczecin (d. ), probably Castellan of Szczecin
 Casimir (d. 1220), Castellan of Kołobrzeg
 Wartislaw (↑ 1230/32), Castellan of Stettin
It is disputed whether Bishop Conrad II of Cammin (d. 1233) was a son of Wartislaw.

Footnotes 

House of Griffins
12th-century births
1196 deaths
12th-century Polish people